= Money Follows the Person =

Money Follows the Person (MFP) Rebalancing Demonstration is part of a comprehensive, coordinated strategy to assist U.S. states, in collaboration with stakeholders, to make widespread changes to their long-term care support systems. This initiative will assist states in their efforts to reduce their reliance on institutional care, while developing community-based long-term care opportunities, enabling the elderly and people with disabilities to fully participate in their communities. Thirty states and the District of Columbia were awarded grants. In 2007, Centers for Medicare and Medicaid Services awarded $1,435,709,479 in MFP grants with states proposing to transition over 34,000 individuals out of institutional settings over the five-year demonstration period.
